Baluga is a Serbian place name. It may refer to:

 Baluga, Ljubićska, settlement in Čačak, Serbia
 Baluga, Trnavska, settlement in Čačak, Serbia

See also
 Beluga (disambiguation)

Serbo-Croatian place names